Lorna Jane Gibson is an American materials scientist and engineer currently the Matoula S. Salapatas Professor of Materials Science and Engineering at Massachusetts Institute of Technology.

Education 
Lorna Gibson received her Bachelor of Applied Science (BASc) in Civil Engineering from the University of Toronto in 1978.  Gibson then attended the University of Cambridge, where she received her PhD in Materials Engineering in 1981 for research supervised by Michael F. Ashby, and focused on the elastic and plastic behavior of cellular materials.

Career and research
After receiving her PhD, Gibson worked as a Senior Engineer at Arctec Canada Ltd., which she left to work in academia.

Gibson worked as an Assistant Professor in Civil Engineering at the University of British Columbia from 1982 to 1984. Gibson then moved to MIT where she became an Associate Professor of Civil Engineering in 1984, and an Associate Professor of Mechanical Engineering in 1987. Gibson became a full professor in both departments in 1995, and a Professor of Materials Science and Engineering in 1996.  Since 1997, she has been the Matoula S. Salapatas Professor of Materials Science and Engineering. Gibson also served as Chair of the Faculty from 2005 to 2006 and was Associate Provost from 2006 to 2008.                      

In 2005, Gibson founded OrthoMimetics Ltd. and served as its Mechanics of Materials Advisor.  In 2009, OrthoMimetics was acquired by Belgian company TiGenix in a deal valued at £14.3 million.

Awards and honors 
In 2015, Gibson was named a MacVicar Faculty Fellow, MIT's top award for undergraduate teaching.

References

Year of birth missing (living people)
Living people
MIT School of Engineering faculty
American materials scientists
University of Toronto alumni
Alumni of the University of Cambridge
Canadian materials scientists
Women materials scientists and engineers